Natalia Abello Vives (born 30 May 1967) is a Colombian lawyer and politician currently serving as the 13th Minister of Transport of Colombia in the Administration of President Juan Manuel Santos Calderón.

A Pontifical Xavierian University lawyer and member of the Radical Change Party, Abello was serving as secretary general of the City of Barranquilla in the Administration of Mayor Elsa Noguera De la Espriella when she was appointed by President Santos as Minister of Transport, taking office on 19 August 2014.

Abello was born on 30 May 1967 in Barranquilla, Atlántico to former governor, minister, and Congressman, Antonio Abello Roca and his wife Yolanda Vives Vengoechea. She is married and has three children.

References

1967 births
Living people
People from Barranquilla
Pontifical Xavierian University alumni
20th-century Colombian lawyers
Radical Change politicians
Ministers of Transport of Colombia
Colombian women lawyers
Women government ministers of Colombia
21st-century Colombian women politicians
21st-century Colombian politicians